KTOP-FM (102.9 MHz) is a commercial radio station licensed to St. Marys, Kansas, and serving the Topeka metropolitan area.  It is owned by Cumulus Media and broadcasts a country music radio format, known as 102.9 Cat Country.  The radio studios and offices are on South Kansas Avenue in Topeka.

History

2014-2015: KTOP-FM – Nash FM 102.9
On October 31, 2014, KTOP rebranded as "Nash FM 102.9".

2015-2021: KTOP-FM - 102.9 Nash Icon
On December 21, 2015, KTOP-FM rebranded as "102.9 Nash Icon".

2021-Present: KTOP-FM - 102.9 Cat Country
On September 13, 2021, KTOP-FM rebranded as "102.9 Cat Country".

See also
 KTOP (AM)

Previous logo

References

External links

Country radio stations in the United States
TOP-FM
Radio stations established in 1993
1993 establishments in Kansas
Cumulus Media radio stations